Lewis Cooper (14 May 1937 – 11 April 2019) was an Australian cricketer. He played 34 first-class matches for Queensland between 1958 and 1968.

See also
 List of Queensland first-class cricketers

References

External links
 

1937 births
2019 deaths
Australian cricketers
Queensland cricketers
Sportspeople from Mackay, Queensland